Captain Underpants and the Tyrannical Retaliation of the Turbo Toilet 2000 is a novel by Dav Pilkey and the eleventh (and penultimate) book in the Captain Underpants series. It was published on August 26, 2014, and features the second and final speaking appearance of the Turbo Toilet 2000, as well as the first appearances of George and Harold's duplicates born through time travel, Yesterday George and Yesterday Harold; as well as the four's new pets and Crackers and Sulu's offspring, Dawn, Orlando, and Tony, who are hybrids between a bionic hamster and a pterodactyl.

Plot
Melvin (the tattletale meanie) made George, Harold, Crackers & Sulu's eggs, and Captain Underpants travel back to the time before the events of the previous novel & he explains why he has bought them back: The kickball from the fifth novel finally hit Uranus, reviving the Turbo Toilet 2000. After he remembers what happened to his fallen allies, he plans to retaliate and builds a rocket scooter from the Robo-Plunger. In the original universe, he disrupted one of Melvin's experiments, prompting Melvin to try and shush him. Angered, a chase ensued until Melvin found one of Mr. Krupp's clipped-off toenails and extracted it into DNA. He ended up defeating the Turbo Toilet 2000, but soon, people start interrupting his experiments over trivial things and after a year, Melvin found Sulu's signal in the future and used the Robo-Squid suit to take George and Harold back home, before he leaves, he warns them of bad to come.

After turning Captain Underpants back into Mr. Krupp, the boys try to nap as they haven't slept in 30 hours. Unfortunately, it turns out that while running from Tippy Tinkletrousers in Book 10, they ended up missing a full school day, and they tried to explain everything to their parents but they didn't believe them, and as a punishment, they are forced to do five hours of yard work. Upon finishing, George then realizes they have a test day tomorrow, prompting them to stay up all night to study. In the morning, they fall asleep in their treehouse, causing them to miss their tests. The next day, Mr. Krupp gleefully reveals that this was actually "Super Secret Test Day" and that the boys got all zeroes on their tests. He also reveals that makeup tests are prohibited and the final exams have been canceled, meaning final grades have already been calculated; while George barely gets a passing grade, which means George will go on to the fifth grade, but Harold had failed, causing him to repeat the fourth grade, and separating the two boys in school at the start of the next school year, much to the glee of the teachers.

George convinces Harold to travel back with the suit to take their tests, but they now have duplicates from that point. After explaining to their past selves what happened, George opts for the two pairs to switch off every other day. As the Yesterday versions go to their houses that Sunday night, the original boys have a sleepover at their treehouse, watching movies while eating pizza and soda. The next morning at school, the original boys go to school to make copies of their latest comic but are caught by Miss Anthrope. George tries to convince her that she is dreaming, but Yesterday George and Harold suddenly arrive at the office, making her realize she has seen two versions of the boys. Fully convinced she is dreaming, she strips naked. The Yesterday versions warn the boys to stay away from school, but the original boys pull some pranks that make all the school's teachers similarly crazy. When Mr. Krupp sees that all teachers are naked, and the two Georges and Harolds, he is speechless and starts repeatedly saying "Buh-buh-bubba-bobba-hob-hubba-hubba-wah-wah." The police eventually come, and one of the teachers pants one the officers, causing all the teachers to be arrested for indecent exposure, reckless endangerment, and pantsing the police officer, while Mr. Krupp is sent to an insane asylum.

Two weeks have passed, the Turbo Toilet 2000 flies down to Earth, while George and Harold, disguised as Talking Toilets, convince the Turbo Toilet 2000 to break down the asylum wall. Over the intercom, George snaps his fingers, turning Mr. Krupp into Captain Underpants, who fights the Turbo Toilet 2000 and wins, but the Turbo Toilet 2000's giant tears of pain fall on his head. Mr. Krupp directs the Turbo Toilet 2000 to George and Harold's treehouse, but the Turbo Toilet 2000 swallows him whole. While shaking the treehouse to get the Yesterday George and Harolds out, Crackers' eggs get cracked on the floor. The Yesterdays discover they are pterodactyl-hamsters, who smash the Turbo Toilet 2000 while rescuing the Yesterdays, after which Mr. Krupp is arrested as a dreaming loon. The four boys regroup and begin to declare this as a happy ending. However, George points out that while the day has been saved, there were a lot of loose ends in the story (the city being destroyed, the school staff being arrested, there being four Georges and Harolds, and the pterodactyl-hamster hybrids having thought that the Georges and Harolds were their parents). The boys then realize there's one final sequel, and say their titular "Oh no!" and "Here we go again!" catchphrases.

Comic: Super Diaper Baby 2½
Book : The news announced that Petey has escaped and vowed to get revenge. The Hoskins explain to search for him, but the doorbell's rung by "P.T. Duckhat, the world's most famous clown(Petey the cat)", who asks if Billy and Diaper Dog can participate in his parade. P.T. gets to take them to a big float of Super Diaper Baby, before revealing himself as Petey. The Robo-Baby destroys the city, with Billy and Diaper Dog in its powerful grip. Luckily, Dog Man scratches himself on its legs and soon, the fleas get in the Robo-Baby's Diaper, making it leave, then they take Petey to jail. But on the way, Petey presses a button on his watch, making something appear and he escapes, as much surprise to Super Diaper Baby, Diaper Dog and Dog Man.

References

Captain Underpants novels
2014 American novels
Fiction set on Uranus
Blue Sky Press books